Aventura is an American bachata group formed in The Bronx, New York. With the lineup always consisting of the members Romeo Santos, Henry Santos, Lenny Santos (Len Melody), and Max Santos (Max Agende), they are regarded as one of the most influential Latin groups of all time. All of the members are of Dominican descent, although Romeo is also half Puerto Rican on his mother's side. They were the first major bachata act to have originated in the United States instead of the Dominican Republic. The group was integral to the evolution of bachata music and are the pioneers of the modern bachata sound. Aventura released five studio albums in a decade, creating many top 10 hits like "Cuando Volverás", "Un Beso", "Mi Corazoncito", "Los Infieles", "El Perdedor", "Por Un Segundo", "Dile Al Amor", among others. They have sold out many arenas including the world famous Madison Square Garden. Aventura has been nominated for awards such as American Music Awards, the Latin Grammy Awards, Billboard Latin Music Awards, and Premio Lo Nuestro. Aventura is one of the most internationally recognized Latin groups of the last two decades and frequently refer to themselves as "K.O.B.", or "Kings of Bachata".

History

Formation and starting as Los Tinellers 
In 1993, Lenny Santos and his brother Max Santos formed Los Tinallers. Lenny and Max were looking for a singer who could help them take their music career more serious. Lenny didn't know anybody in their neighborhood who could sing. He was later introduced to Anthony Santos via one of the group's musicians named Roney Fernandez who attended the same school as Anthony. They clicked instantly, and the two started working on songs together. Anthony was a singer and composer who would sing with his cousin Henry at their local church choir. Anthony later introduces Lenny to his cousin Henry, who also joins the group. The group would perform for their neighbors, at local stores and in the streets for free in the Bronx. The group decided to change the name to Los Tinellers, a play on the word teenager. The group consisted of lead members Lenny and Anthony.

In 1995, the group was discovered by Elvin Polanco when Lenny and Anthony asked him if they could perform at a local parade he was hosting. Elvin, seeing potential in the group, became their manager. He helped them record their first studio album despite having no funds. They released their debut album in 1995 titled "Trampa de Amor" under Elca Productions. The album did not do well commercially, selling a total of five copies. Elvin Polanco ran into some health problems and the group was left without a manager at that time.

Re-invented as Aventura and their success afterwards
In 1996, with the help of new manager Julio César García, the group created a new image. Julio added Henry and Max as lead members. He made the group to resemble popular American boy bands. He renamed the group to Aventura. In 1998 They signed a record deal with Premium Latin Music, Inc. They made their big break in 1999 with their debut album Generation Next along with its main single Cuándo Volverás in hopes of breaking bachata music into the mainstream from its traditional base. They slowly began to gather fans in the cities of Boston and Lancaster. The group was the first to experiment with bachata by fusing the genre with R&B, hip hop & rap, reggae and rock. They were the first bachata act to sing a whole bachata song in English. Anthony innovated bachata with fresh lyrics that incorporated songs with different themes, instead of just singing about heartbreak. Lenny innovated bachata guitar with his use of electric guitars. He also innovated the tone of bachata guitar by adding guitar effects such as wah, phaser, distortion, tremolo, and harmonizer. Max innovated the bachata bass with his use of bass techniques such as slapping and bass slides. Max incorporated a lot of rock bass riffs into bachata. Their sound helped make the genre mainstream, as showed with the success of their 2002 hit song "Obsesión". The song achieved huge success in many countries, topping many international charts like France, Germany, and Italy. Since then they have blown up internationally with hits such as "Su Veneno", "Todavia Me Amas", "El Malo", "Te Invito", "Por Un Segundo", among others. Toby Love began his music career with Aventura and left in 2005 to pursue a solo career in bachata. They have been inducted into the Bronx Walk of Fame.

On September 1, 2007, Aventura performed as the main act on the sold-out Madison Square Garden concert. They were accompanied by Don Omar, Antony Santos, Wisin y Yandel, Miri Ben-Ari, Toby Love, and El Torito.

In 2009, Aventura was invited to perform their hit single "Su Veneno" at the White House for the 44th President of the United States, Barack Obama. They are the first bachata act to ever perform at the White House.

In February 2010, they sold out the Garden once again, but for a legendary four nights in a row. They surpassed American artists such as Lady Gaga and Madonna in ticket sales, being one of the first Latin groups to do so. At one of the concerts they paid homage to Juan Luis Guerra, and even sang some songs with the iconic Dominican singer.

Hiatus
In 2011, the group announced that they would be taking a hiatus to work on individual musical projects. Henry embarked on a respective solo career, looking to be accepted without the group. Romeo took the opportunity to sign with Sony Music Latin, and embarked on his solo career as well. Although Max wanted to focus more on his rap career, he joined his brother Lenny and formed their new bachata group called "D'Element." under Lenny's record label Element Music Group. They then joined Steve Styles from the bachata group Xtreme and renamed the group to Vena.

Reunions
The group reunited to close out the second night of Romeo's sold-out Yankee Stadium concert on July 12, 2014.

On December 1, 2015, it was announced on the band's website and social media that they would have a reunion tour for the whole month of February at the United Palace theater in New York City. Their first concert since their split started with a sold-out crowd on February 4, 2016, with the final concert ending on February 28, 2016. They would've continued on with the tour, but Romeo had to finish the second leg of his Formula Vol. 2 tour.

On April 1, 2019, the group posted an image on their Instagram account teasing a new Aventura single called "Inmortal" slated to be released at 9PM, captioning it "#UTOPIA". At 9PM, Romeo uploaded a video saying that their new song would not be released at 9PM after all, and that it was intended to be an April Fool's joke which led the fans to become upset and lash out on social media. The following day, however, the group apologized and announced that the April Fool's joke was not the song, but was the release date. They then previewed the new single "Inmortal" and its music video, stating that it was being released Friday, as a part of Romeo's fourth upcoming studio album, Utopia. It is their first single in 8 years, and debuted at number 5 on the Hot Latin Songs chart, and at number 95 on the Billboard Hot 100.

Aventura won for Tropical Duo/Group of the Year for the Billboard Latin Music Awards on April 25, 2019. That same night they performed "Inmortal" alongside Raulin Rodriguez who perfomred "La Demanda" with Romeo prior to the other members apprearing on stage.

On September 21, 2019, the group reunited for Romeo's Utopia concert at MetLife Stadium in New Jersey. They performed hits such as "Dile al Amor", "Todavia Me Amas", and "Inmortal". The group performed "Obsesión" alongside Cardi B and also performed her hit song "I Like It". On December 8, 2019, an announcement was made regarding the band's upcoming US tour, La Gira Inmortal. It is their first tour since splitting in 2011, and began in Los Angeles on February 5, 2020. In  March 2020, The group had announced that concerts were postpone due to the COVID-19 pandemic. This included 5 shows at the Radio City Music Hall in New York City that was supposed to take place from March 16 to the 19, and March 22, 2020. It was eventually postpone for the dates July 9 to the 12. However, it was eventually canceled just like all the other scheduled or postpone shows.

In June 2021, Aventura announced the return of the Inmortal Tour. But instead of doing the shows in the venues that were originally planned before their cancelation, they decided to play at stadiums and big arenas in certain cities. Before the tour started, The group released the single Volví on August 3, 2021, featuring Bad Bunny. On August 14, the tour started in Miami, Florida at Hard Rock Stadium. They became the first Latin act to ever sell out the stadium. The tour ended on October 9, 2021, in East Rutherford, New Jersey, at MetLife Stadium. This was the same venue Romeo Santos sold out 2 years prior. They had a show for Arlington, Texas, at Globe Life Field scheduled on August 22, 2021. However it was postpone to October 14, 2021. This would have been the last concert but for some unknown reason the concert never happened. It was never mentioned. There was no news nor any announcements were made about why it was canceled.

On November 4, 2021, Aventura announced their very last concert to be set for December 18, 2021, At the Félix Sánchez Olympic Stadium in Santo Domingo, Dominican Republic. They sold out tickets 3 days after the day they went on sale. A second concert was set for December 19, 2021, which would eventually be their final concert together. Both shows were successful.

On May 10, 2022, Max "Agenda" Santos was interviewed by Mega Atlanta Radio. He mentioned a forthcoming album was in the works, but that he had no concrete announcement to make.

Members

Principal members 
Anthony "Romeo" Santos – lead vocals, backing vocals, songwriter, composer, producer (1994-2011, 2019-2021)
Henry Santos – lead vocals, backing vocals, songwriter, composer, producer (1994-2011, 2019-2021)
Lenny Santos – lead guitar, rhythm guitar, electric guitar, arranger, producer, band director (1994-2011, 2019-2021)
Max Santos – bass guitar, rapper (1994-2011, 2019-2021)

Backing members 
Although they weren't official members of Aventura, they held rather supporting roles. 
Toby Love – backing vocals, congas (2002, 2006, 2007)
Judy Santos – female vocals (2002, 2003, 2005)

Discography

Studio 
As Los Tinellers
 Trampa de Amor (1995)

As Aventura
 Generation Next (1999)
 We Broke the Rules (2002)
 Love & Hate (2003)
 God's Project (2005)
 The Last (2009)

Live
 Unplugged (2004)
 K.O.B. Live (2006)
 Kings Of Bachata: Sold Out At Madison Square Garden (2007)

Greatest Hits or Compilation
 14 + 14 (2011)
 Sólo Para Mujeres (2014)
 Todavía Me Amas: Lo Mejor De Aventura (2016)

DVDs 
 Aventura In Concert: Sold Out At The United Palace (2003) 
 We Broke The Rules (DVD) (2004) 
 The Love & Hate Concert: Sold Out At The United Palace (2005) 
 Kings Of Bachata: Sold Out At Madison Square Garden (2007)
 14 + 14 (2011)

Concert tours 
 K.O.B. Live Tour (2007-2008)
 The Last Tour (2009-2011)
 Aventura Reunion Live NYC (2016)
 Inmortal Tour (2020 - 2021)

Awards and nominations

American Music Awards

|-
|rowspan="1" scope="row"| 2009
|rowspan="1" scope="row"| Aventura
| scope="row"|Favorite Latin Artist
| 
|}

Billboard Latin Music Awards

|-
|rowspan="5" scope="row"| 2006
|rowspan="1" scope="row"| Aventura
| scope="row"|Artist of the Year
| 
|-
|rowspan="2" scope="row"| "Ella Y Yo" 
|rowspan="1" scope="row"|Vocal Duet or Collaboration of the Year, Vocal Duet or Collaboration
| 
|-
|rowspan="2" scope="row"|Tropical Airplay Song of the Year, Duo or Group
| 
|-
|scope="row"|"La Boda"
| 
|-
|scope="row"| God's Project
| scope="row"|Tropical Album of the Year, Duo or Group
| 
|-
|rowspan="5" scope="row"| 2008
|rowspan="1" scope="row"| Aventura
| scope="row"|Top Latin Albums Artist of the Year
| 
|-
|rowspan="3" scope="row"| "Mi Corazoncito" 
|scope="row"|Hot Latin Song of the Year
| 
|-
|scope="row"|Tropical Airplay Song of the Year, Duo or Group
| 
|-
|scope="row"|Latin Ringmaster of the Year
| 
|-
|scope="row"| Kings of Bachata: Sold Out at Madison Square Garden
|scope="row"|Tropical Album of the Year, Duo or Group
| 
|-
|rowspan="5" scope="row"| 2009
|rowspan="1" scope="row"| Aventura
| scope="row"|Latin Digital Download Artist of the Year
| 
|-
|rowspan="2" scope="row"| "El Perdedor" 
|scope="row"|Tropical Airplay Song of the Year, Duo or Group
| 
|-
|scope="row"|Latin Rhythm Airplay Song of the Year, Duo or Group
| 
|-
|scope="row"| Kings of Bachata: Sold Out at Madison Square Garden
|scope="row"|Latin Album of the Year
| 
|-
|scope="row"|K.O.B. Live
|scope="row"|Tropical Album of the Year, Duo or Group
| 
|-
|rowspan="11" scope="row"| 2010
|rowspan="7" scope="row"| Aventura
| scope="row"|Latin Artist of the Year
| 
|-
| scope="row"|Hot Latin Songs Artist of the Year, Duo or Group
| 
|-
| scope="row"|Top Latin Albums Artist of the Year, Duo or Group
| 
|-
| scope="row"|Latin Pop Airplay Artist of the Year, Duo or Group
| 
|-
| scope="row"|Latin Rhythm Airplay, Artista del Año, Dúo o Grupo
| 
|-
| scope="row"|Tropical Airplay Artist of the Year, Duo or Group
| 
|-
| scope="row"|Tropical Albums Artist of the Year, Duo or Group
| 
|-
|rowspan="1" scope="row"| “All Up 2 You”
|scope="row"|Hot Latin Songs, Colaboración Vocal
| 
|-
|rowspan="3" scope="row"| The Last
|scope="row"|Latin Album of the Year
| 
|-
|scope="row"|Tropical Album of the Year
| 
|-
|scope="row"|Latin Digital Album of the Year
| 
|-
|rowspan="8" scope="row"| 2012
|rowspan="7" scope="row"| Aventura
| scope="row"|Your World Award (Premio Tu Mundo)
| 
|-
| scope="row"|Latin Artist of the Year
| 
|-
| scope="row"|Hot Latin Songs Artist of the Year, Duo or Group
| 
|-
| scope="row"|Top Latin Albums Artist of the Year, Duo or Group
| 
|-
| scope="row"|Latin Pop Airplay Artist of the Year, Duo or Group
| 
|-
| scope="row"|Tropical Airplay Artist of the Year, Duo or Group
| 
|-
| scope="row"|Tropical Albums Artist of the Year, Duo or Group
| 
|-
|"El Malo"
| scope="row"|Tropical Airplay Song of the Year
| 
|-
|rowspan="3" scope="row"| 2012
|14 + 14
| scope="row"|Tropical Album of the Year
| 
|-
|rowspan="4" scope="row"| Aventura
| scope="row"|Tropical Albums Artist of the Year, Duo or Group
| 
|-
| scope="row"|Tropical Songs Artist of the Year, Duo or Group
| 
|-
|rowspan="1" scope="row"| 2013
|rowspan="2" scope="row"|Tropical Albums Artist of the Year, Duo or Group
| 
|-
|rowspan="2" scope="row"| 2016
| 
|-
|scope="row"|Sólo Para Mujeres
|scope="row"|Tropical Album of the Year
| 
|-
|rowspan="2" scope="row"| 2017
|scope="row"| Aventura
|scope="row"| Tropical Albums Artist of the Year, Duo or Group
| 
|-
|scope="row"|Todavía Me Amas: Lo Mejor de Aventura
|scope="row"|Tropical Album of the Year
| 
|-
|rowspan="2" scope="row"| 2019
|rowspan="4" scope="row"| Aventura
|scope="row"| Duo/Group Top Latin Albums Artist of the Year
| 
|-
|scope="row"| Tropical Duo/Group of the Year
| 
|-
|rowspan="3" scope="row"| 2020
|scope="row"| Top Latin Albums Artist of the Year, Duo or Group
| 
|-
|scope="row"| Tropical Duo/Group of the Year
| 
|-
|scope="row"|“Inmortal”
|scope="row"|Tropical Song of the Year
|

Latin American Music Awards

|-
|rowspan="1" scope="row"| 2019
|rowspan="1" scope="row"| "Inmortal"
| scope="row"|Favorite Tropical Song
| 
|}

Latin Grammy Awards

|-
|rowspan="1" scope="row"| 2007
|rowspan="1" scope="row"| K.O.B. Live
| scope="row"|Best Contemporary Tropical Album
| 
|}

Premios Juventud

|-
|rowspan="3" scope="row"| 2004
| scope="row"|"Dos locos" 
|rowspan="2"  scope="row"|Best Re-Mix
| 
|-
|scope="row"|"Obsesión" 
| 
|-
| scope="row"|Love & Hate
| scope="row"|I Die Without That CD
| 
|-
|rowspan="1" scope="row"| 2005
|rowspan="2" scope="row"| Aventura
|rowspan="2" scope="row"|Favorite Tropical Artist
| 
|-
|rowspan="2" scope="row"| 2006
| 
|-
|scope="row"| "Ella y Yo" 
| scope="row"|The Perfect Combo
| 
|-
|rowspan="2" scope="row"| 2007
|rowspan="2" scope="row"| Aventura
| scope="row"|Voice of the Moment
| 
|-
| scope="row"|Favorite Tropical Artist
| 
|-
|rowspan="4" scope="row"| 2008
|rowspan="3" scope="row"| Aventura
| scope="row"|Voice of the Moment
| 
|-
| scope="row"|Favorite Tropical Artist
| 
|-
| scope="row"|My Favorite Concert
| 
|-
|scope="row"| "Un Beso"
| scope="row"|My Favorite Ringtone
| 
|-
|rowspan="3" scope="row"| 2009
|rowspan="2" scope="row"| Aventura
| scope="row"|Voice of the Moment
| 
|-
| scope="row"|Favorite Tropical Artist
| 
|-
|rowspan="1" scope="row"| Enrique Iglesias with Aventura
| scope="row"|My Favorite Concert
| 
|-
|rowspan="9" scope="row"| 2010
|rowspan="3" scope="row"| Aventura
| scope="row"|Favorite Tropical Artist
| 
|-
| scope="row"|My Favorite Concert
| 
|-
| scope="row"|Voice of the Moment
| 
|-
|rowspan="4" scope="row"| "Dile al Amor"
| scope="row"|Catchiest Tune
| 
|-
| scope="row"|My Ringtone
| 
|-
| scope="row"|My favorite Video
| 
|-
| scope="row"|Best Ballad
| 
|-
|rowspan="1" scope="row"| "All Up to You"
| scope="row"|The Perfect Combination
| 
|-
|rowspan="1" scope="row"| The Last
| scope="row"|CD To Die For
| 
|-
|}

Premio Lo Nuestro

|-
|rowspan="1" scope="row"| 2004
|rowspan="3" scope="row"| Aventura
| scope="row"|Best Salsa Performance - Tropical
| 
|-
|rowspan="3" scope="row"| 2005
|rowspan="1" scope="row"|Group or Duo of the Year
| 
|-
|rowspan="1" scope="row"|Tropical Traditional Artist of the Year
| 
|-
|scope="row"|Love & Hate
|rowspan="1" scope="row"|Album of the Year
| 
|-
|rowspan="2" scope="row"| 2006
|rowspan="6" scope="row"| Aventura
|rowspan="1" scope="row"|Group or Duo of the Year
| 
|-
|rowspan="1" scope="row"|Traditional Artist of the Year
| 
|-
|rowspan="2" scope="row"| 2007
|rowspan="1" scope="row"|Tropical Group or Duo of the Year
| 
|-
|rowspan="1" scope="row"|Traditional Artist of the Year
| 
|-
|rowspan="5" scope="row"| 2008
|rowspan="1" scope="row"|Tropical Group or Duo of the Year
| 
|-
|rowspan="1" scope="row"|Tropical Traditional Artist of the Year
| 
|-
|scope="row"|"Mi Corazoncito"
|rowspan="2" scope="row"|Tropical Song of the Year
| 
|-
|rowspan="1" scope="row"|"Los Infieles"
| 
|-
|scope="row"|K.O.B. Live
|rowspan="1" scope="row"|Tropical Album of the Year
| 
|-
|rowspan="4" scope="row"| 2009
|rowspan="2" scope="row"| Aventura
|rowspan="1" scope="row"|Tropical Group or Duo of the Year
| 
|-
|rowspan="1" scope="row"|Tropical Traditional Artist of the Year
| 
|-
|scope="row"|"El Perdedor"
|Tropical Song of the Year
| 
|-
|scope="row"|Kings of Bachata: Sold Out at Madison Square Garden
|rowspan="1" scope="row"|Tropical Album of the Year
| 
|-
|rowspan="7" scope="row"| 2010
|rowspan="3" scope="row"| Aventura
|rowspan="1" scope="row"|Artist of the Year
| 
|-
|rowspan="1" scope="row"|Best Group or Duo
| 
|-
|rowspan="1" scope="row"|Tropical Traditional Artist of the Year
| 
|-
|rowspan="2" scope="row"|"All Up 2 You"
|Collaboration of the Year
| 
|-
|Urban Song of the Year
| 
|-
|scope="row"|"Por Un Segundo"
|Tropical Song of the Year
| 
|-
|scope="row"|The Last
|rowspan="1" scope="row"|Tropical Album of the Year
| 
|-
|rowspan="3" scope="row"| 2011
|rowspan="3" scope="row"| Aventura
|rowspan="1" scope="row"|Tropical Group or Duo of the Year
| 
|-
|rowspan="1" scope="row"|Tropical Traditional Artist of the Year
| 
|-
|scope="row"| Video Artist of the Year
| 
|-	
|rowspan="1" scope="row"| 2020
|rowspan="1" scope="row"| "Inmortal" 
|rowspan="1" scope="row"|Tropical Song of the Year
| 
|-
|}

See also

 List of Hispanic and Latino Americans
 List of people from the Dominican Republic

References

External links
 Official website
 iASO Records "Bachata: The New York Style" - describes how Aventura contributed to the music of bachata

 
American bachata musicians
Musical groups from the Bronx
Musical groups disestablished in 2011
Sony BMG artists
Musical groups established in 1993
Musical groups reestablished in 2019
Bachata music groups